Liberation is a collaborative album by Talib Kweli and Madlib. It was made available as a free download from Stones Throw's Rappcats website, and Kweli and Madlib's MySpace pages for the first week of 2007, beginning New Year's Eve 2007. It was removed about a week later. One cover for the album is an adaptation of a piece by guerrilla artist Banksy, and an alternative cover (given away as a print-ready download) is a collage of Talib Kweli, a dollar sign, and the Statue of Liberty.

Reception 
A.J. Henriques of Stylus Magazine gave Liberation a grade of A−, commenting that "Talib Kweli sounds more energized rhyming over Madlib's production than he has in years" and "Madlib has crafted his most traditionally rappable beats since his work with Lootpack."

It was ranked at 53 on PopMatters "101 Hip-Hop Albums of 2007" list.

Track listing

References

External links 
 

2007 albums
Collaborative albums
Concept albums
Talib Kweli albums
Madlib albums
Albums produced by Madlib